William C. Daroff (born 1968) is the CEO of the Conference of Presidents of Major American Jewish Organizations.

Childhood

Daroff was born in Miami Beach, Florida, where his father, neuro-ophthalmology pioneer  Robert B. Daroff, M.D., was a professor at the University of Miami.  He moved with his family to suburban Cleveland, Ohio in 1980, when his father became the chairman of the Department of Neurology at Case Western Reserve University.

Education 

Daroff graduated from Hawken School in suburban Gates Mills, Ohio in 1986. He received his bachelor's degree (summa cum laude) in political science and history, master's degree in political science, and Juris Doctor from Case Western Reserve University in Cleveland, Ohio. He also studied at Kraków, Poland's Jagiellonian University, where he received a certificate in the history of Eastern European Jewry and The Holocaust.

Politics and government (through 2005)

William Daroff worked on three presidential campaign staffs, Rep. Jack Kemp in 1986–88, then-Vice President George H. W. Bush in 1988, and Sen. Bob Dole in 1996.  He also managed campaigns for the United States House of Representatives and for State Treasurer of Ohio. He served as a political appointee at the U.S. Department of Energy in the Administration of President George H. W. Bush, as Special Assistant to Ohio Governor George Voinovich, and as Deputy Director of the Ohio Department of Liquor Control.

In Cleveland, Ohio, he served on the executive committee of the American Jewish Committee, on the board of Bellefaire Jewish Children's Bureau, on the leadership cabinet for Israel Bonds, and on the board of Ohio Jewish Communities.  He was also involved in the Jewish Community Federation of Greater Cleveland, serving on the board of its Young Leadership Division, the community relations committee, the advocacy task force, the Young Adult Initiative board, and the public education initiative.

Upon moving to Washington, D.C., in 2000, Daroff served as director of congressional affairs (2000–2001) and then deputy executive director (2001–2005) of the Republican Jewish Coalition.

Previous position (2005–2019) 

In October 2005, Daroff became the vice president for public policy and director of the Washington Office of The Jewish Federations of North America (JFNA) formerly known as United Jewish Communities, where he advocates for the American Jewish community's agenda with the United States government. As the chief lobbyist and principal spokesperson on public policy and international affairs for the 156 Jewish federations and 300 independent communities represented by JFNA, Daroff promotes the interests of Jewish federations on Capitol Hill and in the executive branch of the United States. He became senior vice president in 2013.

Daroff has testified before committees in both the United States House of Representatives and the United States Senate.

President George W. Bush appointed Daroff to serve on the honorary delegation to accompany him to Jerusalem for the celebration of the 60th anniversary of the State of Israel in May 2008. In September 2007, Daroff was appointed  by President George W. Bush to be a member of the U.S. Commission for the Preservation of America's Heritage Abroad, which is charged with the oversight of the protection of properties in Europe associated with the heritage of U.S. citizens, including Jewish cemeteries, synagogues, and memorials.  He served during the Obama Administration as well, leaving the Commission in 2011.

Daroff was named one of the 50 most influential Jews in America by The Jewish Daily Forward newspaper. Slate Magazine stated, "Daroff is also one of the country's better-connected Jewish operatives." He is widely quoted in newspapers, magazines, on the radio, and television across the world.

He was a member of the Board of the World Council of Jewish Communal Service as well as Vice President of the Board of the Jewish Communal Service Association of North America. He has also served in leadership positions with the Jewish Federation of Greater Washington.

In May 2009, Daroff was named by the Jewish Telegraphic Agency (JTA) as being among the most influential Jewish Twitterers in the world for his tweeting from @Daroff. He was also called "the fastest tweet in the Jewish organizational world" in a 2010 Jewish Telegraphic Agency (JTA) profile. He often speaks publicly on social media, including in high-profile settings such as South By Southwest in 2012.

He has also been widely quoted in leading news outlets, including The New York Times, The Washington Post, USA Today, The Los Angeles Times, Newsweek, The International Herald-Tribune, Slate, The Jerusalem Post, Ha’aretz, The Jewish Telegraphic Agency (JTA), The Jewish Daily Forward, and newspapers around the world. He has also made frequent radio and television appearances.

External links
Daroff's office web site
Daroff's official biography

References 

1968 births
Jewish Federations of North America
20th-century American Jews
Living people
Case Western Reserve University alumni
Case Western Reserve University School of Law alumni
American lobbyists
American campaign managers
Lawyers from Washington, D.C.
Lawyers from Cleveland
American Zionists
People from Shaker Heights, Ohio
Hawken School alumni
21st-century American Jews